Daniel von Bargen (June 5, 1950 – March 1, 2015) was an American character actor of film, stage and television. He was known for his roles as Mr. Kruger on Seinfeld, Commandant Edwin Spangler on Malcolm in the Middle, and Chief Grady in Super Troopers.

Early life
Von Bargen was born to Juanita J. (née Bustle) and Donald L. von Bargen, and was of German and English descent. He was born in Cincinnati, where he grew up for most of his childhood before moving with his family to Southern California. In 1968, von Bargen graduated from Reading High School. He graduated from Purdue University in Indiana.

Career
In 1974, von Bargen made his television debut in Feasting with Panthers, a play about Oscar Wilde's imprisonment at the Reading Gaol, on PBS's Great Performances anthology series.

Von Bargen's film credits included The Silence of the Lambs, London Betty, RoboCop 3, Basic Instinct, Broken Arrow, Truman, The Majestic, Philadelphia, O Brother, Where Art Thou?, Snow Falling on Cedars, Thinner,  A Civil Action, Disney's The Kid, Super Troopers and Universal Soldier: The Return.

Von Bargen played the maniacal sorcerer Nix in Clive Barker's Lord of Illusions and the Sheriff in The Postman. He played a terrorist in a season 5 episode of The X-Files. Von Bargen had played Mr. Kruger, George Costanza's boss, in the ninth season of Seinfeld, and also played the recurring antagonist Commandant Edwin Spangler in the FOX comedy Malcolm in the Middle for the first three seasons.

Von Bargen's stage career included a long residency with Trinity Repertory Company in Providence, Rhode Island; he made his Off-Broadway debut in 1981 in Missing Persons. He also appeared in the debut of Larry Gelbart's Mastergate and other plays at the American Repertory Theater in Cambridge, Massachusetts. He made his Broadway debut when the show went to New York City. In 1990, he won a Theatre World Award for Outstanding New Performer for his role in Mastergate. His last films roles were as Maury in London Betty and as George Burgess in Things That Hang from Trees.

In 1993, von Bargen narrated the unabridged Streets of Laredo audiobook.

Personal life

Von Bargen was married to actress Margo Skinner, but the two were divorced by the time of her death on April 11, 2005. Skinner died in her sleep of a heart attack in her New York City apartment.

Health issues and death
On February 20, 2012, von Bargen shot himself in the temple during an apparent suicide attempt. After von Bargen placed a phone call to a 911 operator, emergency crews were dispatched to his Montgomery, Ohio, apartment. Von Bargen suffered from diabetes and, at the time of his attempted suicide, had been living with one leg amputated. He was due to have  several toes amputated on his remaining foot and reportedly did not want to submit to another surgery.

Von Bargen died on March 1, 2015, of undisclosed causes, having experienced complications from diabetes for years, at the age of 64. The Washington Post reported that his death "came after an unspecified long illness." Von Bargen's ashes were given to his family.

Filmography

Television

Film

Stage

References

External links
 

1950 births
2015 deaths
20th-century American male actors
21st-century American male actors
American amputees
American male film actors
American male stage actors
American male television actors
American people of English descent
American people of German descent
Male actors from Cincinnati
Purdue University alumni